Winter Park History Museum, also known as the Winter Park Historical Museum, is a local history museum in Winter Park, Orange County, Florida. It is operated by the Winter Park Historical Association and located in a former railroad freight depot. 

The museum's collections of historic artifacts include area schools, medical and military items, vintage postcards and photographs, Boy Scout items, and items of local businesses and industries.

Exhibitions have included local area history subjects such as area railroads, the history and culture of the turpentine industry, Winter Park High School history, and the city's Colony Theatre (Winter Park, Florida).

See also
List of museums in Florida

References

External links

Winter Park History Museum website

Buildings and structures in Winter Park, Florida
Museums in Orange County, Florida
History museums in Florida
Local museums